The 1990 Western Kentucky Hilltoppers football team represented Western Kentucky University as an independent during the 1990 NCAA Division I-AA football season Led by second-year head coach Jack Harbaugh, the Hilltoppers compiled a record of 2–8.

Schedule

References

Western Kentucky
Western Kentucky Hilltoppers football seasons
Western Kentucky Hilltoppers football